The Statue of Ebih-Il is a 25th-century BC statue of the praying figure of Ebih-Il (EN-TI-IL, e-bih-il), superintendent of the ancient city-state of Mari in modern eastern Syria. The statue was discovered at the Temple of Ishtar in Mari during excavations directed by French archaeologist André Parrot. It is made of gypsum, with inlays of schist, shells and lapis lazuli. The statue is displayed in the Musée du Louvre. It has been described as "a masterpiece by virtue of its craftsmanship, state of preservation, and expressive style."

Overview 
The statue, made of translucent smooth alabaster, depicts the figure of a man seated on a wicker hassock. He is shown in a praying posture with hands clasped against his chest conveying his devotion to the deity.

The man's head is shaved. His long beard is composed of vertical curls and has drilled holes drilled formerly inlaid with another, now-lost material. The beard accentuates the figure's cheeks and finely sculpted lips that convey a half-smile. The figure's staring blue eyes were crafted with particular care and detail. Flakes of schist, shells and lapis lazuli form the eyelashes and eyelids, cornea and iris, respectively. The lapis lazuli inlays were imported from as far east as Afghanistan.

The figure has a bare torso and thin waist. The hands are clasped against the chest, with the left hand closed and placed inside the right hand. The figure's only dress is the Sumerian-style ceremonial kaunakes skirt. This elaborate fleece skirt appears to be made from animal hide (probably sheepskin or goatskin) as evidenced by the presence of a tail at the back. The figure's feet are missing but their attachment piece is still showing under the dress.

The inscription in proto-cuneiform signs on the rear, which identifies the work, reads: "Statue of Ebih-Il, the superintendent, dedicated to Ishtar Virile."

Excavation 
The statue was discovered in two parts by a French excavation team under André Parrot. The head was found on the pavement of the outer court of the Temple of Ishtar, and a few meters away the body along with a smaller statue of King Lamgi-Mari. The left arm and elbow were broken, and the base of the right elbow was shattered. The statues were the first major discovery of the Mari excavations started winter 1933, the head found 22 January 1934, the body 23 January 1934.

Details of the statue

See also 

Art of Mesopotamia
Investiture of Zimrilim
Statue of Iddi-Ilum

References

Citations

Bibliography 

25th-century BC works
3rd-millennium BC sculptures
Sculpture of the Ancient Near East
Syrian art
Archaeological discoveries in Mari, Syria
Near East and Middle East antiquities of the Louvre
Alabaster
Sumerian art and architecture
1934 archaeological discoveries
Early Dynastic Period (Mesopotamia)